Go Go Go or alike may refer to:

Books
"Go, Go, Go, Said the Bird" a short story by Sonya Dorman from Harlan Ellison's science fiction anthology Dangerous Visions
Go! Go! Go!: The SAS. The Iranian Embassy Siege. The True Story, 2011, by Will Pearson and Rusty Firmin

TV
The Go!Go!Go! Show, a British family music theatre show
Drama Go! Go! Go!, Chinese romance drama

Music
Go!Go!Go! (band), British musical group
Go!!GO!GO!Go!! eighth studio album by Japanese rock band GO!GO!7188

Songs
"Go! Go! Go!", song by The Treniers, 1951
"Go Go Go Go", written by Mack David and Jerry Livingston and popularized by Dean Martin, 1951
"Go Go Go" (Roy Orbison song), 1956
"Go Go Go" (Chuck Berry song), 1961, based on the Johnny B. Goode song character
"Go, Go, Go! (This Is It)", by Rip Rig + Panic, 1981
"Go! Go! Go!", a B-side to "You and Me" by One Night Only, 2007
"Go Go Go!", a B-side to "Bye Bye Bye!" by Cute
"Go Go Go", by Capitol K, 2008
"Go Go Go!" (Lethal Bizzle song), 2010
"Go Go Go" (Sleeping With Sirens song), 2015